The 1969 Canadian-American Challenge Cup was the fourth season of the Can-Am auto racing series.  It consisted of FIA Group 7 racing cars running two-hour sprint events.  It began June 1, 1969, and ended November 9, 1969, after eleven rounds.

This was the first season of Can-Am following the demise of the similar United States Road Racing Championship.  With several USRRC events choosing to continue on under Can-Am, the series schedule was greatly expanded beyond its normal six event season.  This also meant that the season was run over a greater period of time, rather than just being run in the autumn.

The season was swept by McLaren, whose founder Bruce McLaren won the championship over teammate and fellow New Zealander Denny Hulme.  McLaren won six races to Hulme's five, winning the championship by a mere five points.

Schedule

Season results

Drivers Championship
Points are awarded to the top ten finishers in the order of 20-15-12-10-8-6-4-3-2-1.  Only the best nine finishes out of eleven rounds counted towards the championship.  Points earned but not counting towards the championship are marked by parenthesis.

References

 
 

 
Can-Am seasons
Can-Am